Jeffrey Robert Immelt (born February 19, 1956) is an American business executive currently working as a venture partner at New Enterprise Associates. He previously served as the CEO of General Electric from 2001 to 2017, and the CEO of GE's Medical Systems division from 1997 to 2000.

Early life
Immelt was born in Cincinnati, the son of Donna Rosemary (née Wallace), a school teacher, and Joseph Francis Immelt, who managed the General Electric Aircraft Engines Division.

Immelt attended Finneytown High School; he played football in college and was an offensive tackle. He earned an A.B. in applied mathematics and economics cum laude from Dartmouth College in 1978. He was president of his fraternity, Phi Delta Alpha.

During his years at Dartmouth he worked summers on a Ford assembly line in Cincinnati; after graduating he worked for Procter & Gamble. He obtained an MBA from Harvard Business School in 1982 and described business school as "one of the most intense times of your life."

General Electric 

Immelt joined GE in 1982, working in GE's plastics, appliances, and healthcare businesses. He became a GE officer in 1989, joined the GE Capital board in 1997 and took on the leadership of GE Healthcare before being named CEO in 2001.

CEO

Four days after Immelt became CEO, the September 11 attacks took place which cost GE's insurance business $600 million, killed two employees and directly affected the company's Aircraft Engines sector. After becoming CEO, Immelt offered an expanded set of financial reports in addition to GE's traditional format.

Immelt participated actively in mergers and acquisitions, purchasing Amersham PLC for $9.5 billion in 2004 and Alstom's power business for approximately €12.4  billion in 2015. Immelt sold GE's plastics business for $11.6 billion in 2007, NBC Universal for $8 billion in 2013, and GE's appliances business for $3.3 billion in 2014. In 2015, GE announced it would sell its real estate holdings for $26.5 billion and most of GE Capital's assets.

Employment
At the end of 2001 when Immelt replaced Welch, GE employed 219,000 worldwide and 125,000 in the US, as reported in its SEC Form 10K for 2001. GE's SEC Form 10K for 2014 states that worldwide employment is 305,000, and US employment is 136,000. These employment levels have varied significantly under Immelt.

General Electric year end employment has varied from 273,000 in 2010 to 305,000 in 2014, a net increase of 37,000. Employment had dropped from 315,000 in 2002 to 307,000 in 2013.

Criticism
During Immelt's tenure as CEO, shares of GE dropped 30%, while the S&P 500 rose by 134%. GE restated its earnings in 2005 and agreed to pay the SEC $50 million to settle allegations of accounting fraud in 2009.

GE receiving aid from the Federal Reserve while not paying federal income taxes became a political issue in the 2016 presidential campaign, although GE did pay taxes in other jurisdictions. At the end of 2012, over $100 billion had been kept offshore to avoid a special federal repatriation tax. In 2015, GE announced a repatriation program for part of its cash balances. In 2016, GE moved its headquarters from Connecticut to Massachusetts, citing Connecticut's tax increases.

Immelt had an empty private jet following his own private jet, in case there were delays with his primary jet.

Compensation and retirement
Immelt's compensation has fluctuated significantly. As CEO of General Electric in 2007, Immelt earned a total compensation of $14,209,267. In 2008, he earned a total compensation of $5,717,469. In 2009, Immelt earned a total compensation of $5,487,155. In 2010, Immelt's compensation nearly tripled to $15.2 million. Immelt had a total five year compensation of $53.82 million through 2011, an income which ranked sixth among executives employed by US-based conglomerates. Some components of his total compensation package over the years have been newsworthy. In some years he was granted stock options at $0, and in other years he was paid no bonus. In 2014 his compensation totalled $18.8 million, a decrease from his 2013 compensation of $25.8 million. That 2013 compensation had risen 20% over his 2012 compensation of $20.6 million.

On June 12, 2017, GE announced that Immelt would retire as CEO and would be replaced by John L. Flannery. Immelt stepped down in October 2017.

Later career

Uber 
Immelt was initially a top candidate to become CEO of Uber, replacing founder Travis Kalanick. He was initially Kalanick's favorite for the post, in part because he was still open to Kalanick still having a significant role. However, Immelt's presentation before the board was poorly received; one director called it "a bad joke," and even Kalanick soured on him. Immelt withdrew from consideration after a director privately told him he had no chance at getting the job.

athenahealth 
On February 7, 2018, Immelt became the chairman of the board at athenahealth. Immelt joined the board of directors of Radiology Partners two weeks later. On June 6, 2018, Immelt was named executive chairman of athenahealth. athenahealth was acquired by Veritas Capital in 2019.

Tuya Smart 
Immelt became a board member of Tuya Smart in September 2019. Immelt attended the Consumer Electronics Show in 2020 on behalf of Tuya Smart.

Built Robotics 
On June 30, 2020, Immelt was announced as an advisor to Built Robotics. He joined Eric Sellman, Vice President of Civil at Mortenson, in the role.

Philanthropy

Charitable activities
Immelt serves on the board of two non-profit organizations. He was a Charter Trustee of his alma mater, Dartmouth, from 2008 to 2016. He has also served Dartmouth on its Alumni Council and as a class officer.

Immelt has spoken about the benefits of football to his career. He announced a series of initiatives with NFL Commissioner Goodell including a GE investment of $40 million to develop diagnostic equipment for use in head trauma injuries, and GE's participation in a separate $20 million effort to develop safer helmets and other equipment.

The GE Foundation has been praised for its charitable contributions under Immelt's leadership.

Immelt has returned to his hometown High School, Finneytown, to contribute to the Finneytown Schools Education Foundation. The Foundation established the Jeff Immelt Award for leadership in football.

Public service
Immelt served as chairman of The Business Council from 2005 to 2006.

Immelt was as a member of the board of the Federal Reserve Bank of New York from 2006 to 2011.

As one of America's top CEOs, Immelt has been a leading proponent of diversity in the work place, saying "If you're serious about ... making the world work better, the only discriminating factor should be excellence. In other words, GE is committed to diversity ...[because] ... it's the only way to do business right ... [GE is] committed to employing a diverse workforce with the most innovative minds in the world."

Immelt was appointed to the President's Economic Recovery Advisory Board in 2009 and appointed chairman in 2011. The council met four times, ending on January 17, 2012.

Honors
Jeff Immelt has earned significant honors throughout his career, beginning with his graduation from Dartmouth cum laude and earning the Earl Hamilton Varsity Award, as a college football player, for friendship and character. Later in 2002, he received the Robert Fletcher Award from Dartmouth's Thayer School of Engineering.

Career honors
Barron's has named Immelt one of the "World's Best CEOs" three times; other outlets have criticized his performance. He is a member of The American Academy of Arts & Sciences. The Financial Times named him "Man of the Year" in 2003. Immelt was named to Time magazine's 100 most influential people in the world in 2009.

In 2009, Immelt won the Oslo Business for Peace Award, an award chosen by winners of the Nobel Prizes in Economics and Peace and given to leaders in the private sector who have demonstrated transformative and positive change through ethical business practices.

Immelt was awarded the 2014 American Football Coaches Association Tuss McLaughry Award, given to a distinguished American (or Americans) for the highest distinction in service to others. In accepting the award, he said "I am a product of football and I owe a great debt of gratitude to that system. What I learned playing football enters my life every day."

In April 2015, Immelt won the 20th edition of the Leonardo International Prize "as a foreigner who reinforced his country's cultural and economic ties with Italy."

On 24 December 2015, Immelt was listed by UK-based company Richtopia at number 50 in the list of 500 Most Influential CEOs.

In 2017, Immelt was honored with an Edison Achievement Award for his commitment to innovation throughout his career.

Personal life
Immelt is married to his wife Andrea and they have one daughter, Sarah. They lived in New Canaan, Connecticut, until 2015. They then purchased a home in Boston.

References

Further reading

 David Magee, 2009, Jeff Immelt and the New GE Way: Innovation, Transformation, and Winning in the 21st Century, McGraw-Hill Professional. 
 The Immelt Revolution,  businessweek, 2005

External links
 General Electric, Executive Bio and Photo
 September 2009 speech by Immelt regarding GE Healthcare
 Leading Questions: GE's Jeff Immelt, Interview with BBC Business
 

|-

1956 births
Dartmouth Big Green football players
General Electric people
Harvard Business School alumni
Living people
Obama administration personnel
Businesspeople from Cincinnati
General Electric chief executive officers